Two ships built by American International Shipbuilding in were named Comerant at launch. They are disambiguated by month of delivery:

Ship names